Western Sambo is a coral reef located within the Florida Keys National Marine Sanctuary. It lies to the south of Boca Chica Key, within Western Sambos Ecological Reserve.  The reef itself lies along the southern edge of the reserve boundary.

See also
Eastern Sambo

External links
 Benthic Habitat Map

References
 NOAA National Marine Sanctuary Maps, Florida Keys West
 NOAA page on Western Sambo
 NOAA Navigational Chart 11446

Coral reefs of the Florida Keys